Stjepan Obran (born 2 August 1956) is a Croatian handball player. He competed in the men's tournament at the 1980 Summer Olympics.

References

External links
 

1956 births
Living people
Croatian male handball players
Olympic handball players of Yugoslavia
Handball players at the 1980 Summer Olympics
Sportspeople from Koprivnica
20th-century Croatian people